Puistola (Finnish) or Parkstad (Swedish) is a railway station in the Tapulikaupunki district of Helsinki, Finland. It is located between the stations of Tapanila and Tikkurila, along the main railroad track from Helsinki to Riihimäki, about 14 kilometres northeast from the Helsinki Central railway station.

References

External links 

Railway stations in Helsinki
Railway stations opened in 1910
1910 establishments in Finland